Lyndon Pete Patterson (December 20, 1934 – December 9, 2017) was an American politician from Texas who served the Texas House of Representatives from 1977-1999 as well as a rancher and a realtor.

Life
Patterson was born on December 20, 1934 at Brookston, Lamar, Texas, USA to Opal Oakleaf Patterson and Sherman Alva. His father died in 1945. He married Doris Adlene Bell on November 16, 1952 and they were together ever since. They later had 4 children. His mother died in 1981. He died on December 9, 2017 at the age of 82 in a nursing center in Honey Grove, Fannin County, Texas, USA.

Politics
He served in the Texas House of Representatives from 1977-1999 under 3 districts, District 9 (1977-1983), then District 2 (1983-1995), then District 3 (1995-1999).

References

1934 births
2017 deaths
Members of the Texas House of Representatives
People from Lamar County, Texas